Ablitt is a surname that derives from the word 'abet'.

Notable people with this name include:

Tim Ablitt, leader of the English Defence League
Taylor Ablitt, founder of Diply
Ablitt Cup, named after Bernard Ablitt
Nathan Ablitt, in Mildenhall Fen Tigers
Steven Ablitt in 2001 IAAF World Cross Country Championships – Junior men's race

References